Blood Car is a 2007 black comedy film directed by Alex Orr and starring Anna Chlumsky, Katie Rowlett, and Mike Brune. It is set in a not-too-distant future where gasoline prices have become exorbitant ($30+ US/gallon). Things take a turn for the worse when a kindergarten teacher (Mike Brune) invents a car that runs on a different fuel source: blood.

Plot
Archie Andrews is a vegan kindergarten teacher who buys products from Lorraine's vegetarian road side stand. He is developing an engine that runs on wheatgrass with no results until he accidentally cuts his finger and the blood falls in the wheatgrass, which filters to the engine and then causes it to run.

Andrews then tests his car out and offers a ride to Denise, who runs a meat stand and is a rival to Lorraine. After Denise expresses an interest in Archie (believing he can afford 30+ dollars a gallon gasoline), he drives her home, but runs out of fuel. Archie turns to hunting animals, but they do not provide sufficient blood. He turns to larger prey such as predatory people, and eventually, settles for any victim after rebuilding a more efficient blood engine.

The government, which has been tracking Archie's progress, eventually offers him any position he wants, provided he can create more "Blood Cars" after the original is destroyed, and his existence is erased. Archie is concerned where the fuel for the new cars will come from, and the federal agents promise him it will come from invalids, convicted criminals, and the homeless. Archie agrees. Images of Archie's rise as President are cut with the government agents murdering Lorraine, Denise, his kindergarten students, and anyone that saw him developing the Blood Car.

Cast
 Mike Brune as Archie Andrews
 Anna Chlumsky as Lorraine
 Katie Rowlett as Denise

Reception
On Rotten Tomatoes the film has an approval rating of 63% based on reviews from 13 critics.

Variety wrote :"One-joke pic runs out of (ahem) gas in its last lap, and is too marginal for extensive travel. But it’s still frequently hilarious"

Film festivals
Blood Car has been shown at various film festivals, including:
 Atlanta Film Festival, 2007
 Austin Film Festival, 2007
 Cinequest, 2007
 Seattle's True Independent Film Festival (STIFF)
 Toronto After Dark Film Festival
 Edinburgh International Film Festival

Award
Blood Car was winner of the New Visions Award at the 2007 Cinequest Film Festival.
Winner - Best Narrative Feature Film at the 2007 Chicago Underground Film Festival
Winner - Best Feature Narrative Film at the 2007 Philadelphia FirstGlance Film Festival 
Winner - Best Narrative Feature Film Award at the 2007 Atlanta Underground Film Festival
Winner - Audience Award 2007 Faux Film Festival  
Winner - Best Feature – 2007 Backseat Film Festival

United Kingdom release 
Though filmed in 2007, the film released in the United Kingdom on 23 February 2012.

See also 
 Upír z Feratu, another film involving a car that uses blood for fuel
 Road Kill, film about a road train that uses a pulp made by grinding human bodies for fuel
 Blood Drive, a TV series centered on a road race with cars that use blood for fuel

References

External links
 
 
 Blood Car at Cinequest

Films set in the future
American comedy horror films
2007 films
2007 comedy horror films
2000s English-language films
2000s American films